National Route 265 is a national highway of Japan connecting Kobayashi, Miyazaki and Aso, Kumamoto in Japan, with a total length of 203.8 km (126.64 mi).

References

National highways in Japan
Roads in Kumamoto Prefecture
Roads in Miyazaki Prefecture